Ju Kyu-chang (25 November 1928 – 3 September 2018) was a North Korean politician, who served as the director of the Workers' Party of Korea's (WPK) Machine-Building Industry Department.

Ju was reportedly the head of North Korea's nuclear and missile programs. His background was in research and development, as opposed to his deputy director Hong Sung-mu, who is more manufacture-oriented.

Ju was named to the Central Military Commission of the Workers' Party of Korea in 2010.

Ju died in Pyongyang on 3 September 2018 from pancytopenia.

Awards and honors 
A frame displaying Ju's decorations was placed at the foot of his bier during his funeral.

References

1928 births
2018 deaths
Alternate members of the 6th Politburo of the Workers' Party of Korea
Members of the 6th Central Committee of the Workers' Party of Korea